Charles Blaney Cluskey (ca. 1808–1871) was an American architect active from the 1830s to the start of the Civil War, and therefore he is recognized as an antebellum architect. He is reputed to be the initiator of the Greek Revival–style in the south, and his commissions, both public and private, can still be seen in Augusta, Milledgeville and Savannah, Georgia.

Early life
Born in Ireland, Cluskey emigrated to the United States in 1827, landing in New York City, where he trained with the architectural firm Town and Davis. He moved to Savannah in 1829, where he did his first solo-commission, the Hermitage Plantation house, in 1830, now demolished.

Career
The Old Medical College (later Georgia Health Sciences University), built in 1837, was Cluskey's first major commission and the first example of the Greek revival style that would be his trademark. The Old Medical College is considered "one of his masterpieces". It is based on the Villa Capra "La Rotonda". 

In 1839 he completed the Governor's Mansion, also based on the Villa Capra, and the main building for Oglethorpe University in 1840. The National Register nomination document for his Governor's Mansion asserts that: "His works gained recognition because they were a direct departure from the more conservative designs of rectangular shapes that had been generally used in domestic architecture," and that the building is "without question, his most perfect example of the Greek Revival house. 

In the 1840 and 50s, Cluskey moved to private commissions in Savannah, three houses still existing in what is now the Savannah Historic District. Notable examples existing in Savannah today are the Harper Fowlkes House and Sorrel-Weed Houses.

In 1845 he was elected Savannah city surveyor.

He moved to Washington, D.C., in 1847. He later provided input on planned additions to the Executive Mansion, but his suggestions were not implemented.

In 1869 Cluskey moved back to Savannah. In the aftermath of the Civil War he was commissioned to rebuild the St. Simons Island Light.

Selected works
Hermitage Plantation house (1830), Savannah (demolished)
Medical College of Georgia (later Georgia Health Sciences University) (1834-37), Augusta
Oglethorpe University (1837-40), Baldwin County near Milledgeville
Governor's Mansion (1837-39), Milledgeville
Harper Fowlkes House (1844), Savannah
St. Vincent's Academy (1845), Savannah
Sorrel–Weed House (1853), Savannah
Philbrick–Eastman House (1853), Savannah
Mills House (1855), Griffin
U.S. Customs House and Court House (1861), Galveston
St. Simons Island Light and keeper's residence (1869), St. Simons Island

Death
He died due to malaria in 1871 before completing the St. Simons Island lighthouse.

Gallery

References

1808 births
1871 deaths
19th-century American architects
People from Savannah, Georgia
Irish emigrants to the United States (before 1923)
Architects from Georgia (U.S. state)